Lavigeria coronata is a species of tropical freshwater snail with a gill and an operculum, aquatic gastropod molluscs in the family Paludomidae.

This species is found in the Democratic Republic of the Congo and Tanzania. Its natural habitat is freshwater lakes. It is threatened by habitat loss.

References

Paludomidae
Gastropods described in 1888
Taxonomy articles created by Polbot